Jorge Cafrune is the fifth disc by Argentine singer Jorge Cafrune, recorded in Argentina in 1962 on the label H y R.

Track listing 

 "Tierra querida"
 "Chacarera del pantano"
 "Ki Chororo"
 "El llamero"
 "La añera"
 "Las golondrinas" (2)
 "Canción de luna y carnaval"
 "Río de los pájaros"
 "De mi madre"
 "El silbidito"
 "La alhajita"
 "Pato sirirí"
 "Niño rhupa"

Jorge Cafrune albums
1962 albums
Spanish-language albums